Sekolah Menengah Kebangsaan Anderson or short name SMK Anderson or Anderson School Ipoh, is a Malaysian government secondary school located on Jalan Hospital.

Sekolah Menengah Kebangsaan Anderson is located at Jalan Raja Ashman Shah, Ipoh, Perak. This school is an English school established during British occupation in Malaya. Anderson Ipoh School officially opened on 6 February 1909.

SMK Anderson had 813 students in the morning sessions and 176 students in the afternoon, bringing the total number of students to 989 as of 3 April 2018.

There were 46 male and 72 female teachers, bringing the total number of teachers to 118 as of 2018.

History 
Sekolah Menengah Kebangsaan Anderson was officially opened on 6 February 1909. The name "Anderson" was taken after the British High Commissioner in Malaya at that time, (also the Governor of the Straits Settlements), Sir John Anderson. Anderson School was created to provide opportunities for Malay students who did not have the opportunity to enter the Kuala Kangsar Malay College. It also became an alternative for Malay parents who did not wish to send their sons to Anglo-Chinese School, a Christian institution.

Lt. Col. J. H, Tyte, Senior Assistant at Victoria's Secondary School was appointed as the first Headmaster. He is assisted by Mr. E. C. Smith who is the Senior Assistant. The pioneer teacher consists of a trained teacher and five senior SMK Victoria students. The first school building was designed by local architects, namely Mr. C. H. La Brooy and located on Jalan Douglas. The building is now used as the Perak Religious Office.

On 6 February 2009, SMK Anderson celebrated the 100th anniversary of the establishment of the Sekolah Menengah Kebangsaan Anderson (SMK) Anderson which was launched by the Sultan of Perak, Sultan Azlan Shah. Also on the move was the Raja Permaisuri Perak, Tuanku Bainun; Raja Dihirir Perak, Raja Raja Jaafar Raja Muda Musa; Raja Puan Muda Perak, Raja Nor Mahani Raja Shahar Shah and the 11th Menteri Besar Perak, Datuk Dr. Zambry Abd. Kadir.

The  was held on 7 July 2018, the patron of which is DYTM Raja Jaafar Bin Raja Muda Musa and Dato' Seri Ahmad Faizal Azumu.

Anderson School Prefectorial Board
Anderson School Ipoh is also known for their century-old prefectorial board. The prefectorial board, also known as prefects, has a unique tradition and features making them different from other schools' prefects. Only the best of the best are selected to become members of this highly regarded organisation. Selection criteria for the Head Boy or Head Prefects is via a voting system among prefects and teachers. In 2008, the prefectorial board batch 2007–2008 created a logo and a motto for the school prefects. It is understood that Anderson School Prefects is the only prefects in the nation that has their own logo and motto.

Anderson School Editorial Board 

Anderson School Editorial Board publishes the yearbook titled The Andersonian annually to commemorate the past year of the school. Interesting facts and pictures are published in the yearbook to cherish the memories of the past year. The yearbook is bought by the students and teachers. The editorial board consists of students helping to take pictures of events and writing articles for the yearbook. In 2018, QR codes were introduced to the yearbook which, when scanned, redirect to YouTube videos highlighting the event. A theme is chosen every year for the yearbook. In 2018, Anderson School celebrated its 100th Sports Day; the 2018 edition yearbook was theme was 'Sporting Glory'.

Notable alumni 
The alumni or old boys of the school are or may be affiliated with ASOBA, the Anderson School Old Boys' Association. The current president of the association is Dato' Seri Hj. Abdul Azim b. Dato' Mohd Zabidi. 

Notable alumni include:

 Tun (Dr) Haji Ahmad Sarji Abdul Hamid – 9th Chief Secretary to the Government of Malaysia
 Ahmad Boestamam – freedom fighter, politician and was the founding president of Parti Rakyat Malaysia and Parti Marhaen Malaysia
 Chan Sek Keong –  (Chief Justice of the Republic of Singapore) 
 Dato' Mohammad Nor Khalid (Lat) – Malaysian cartoonist
 Tun S. Samy Vellu –  politician and 7th President of the Malaysian Indian Congress
 Dr. Wong Jeh Shyan – former-CEO of CommerceNet Singapore
 Dato' Sivarraajh Chandran – politician and former Member of Parliament for Cameron Highlands
Dato' Seri Ahmad Faizal Azumu – politician and former Minister of Youth and Sports

Student demographics

Extra-curriculum

Sport Houses 
The student body is currently sorted into six sport houses. Students represent their sport houses in the school's annual Sports Day competitions. The school celebrated its 100th year Sports Day on 7 July 2018. One of the earlier sport houses, Sultan, was introduced to honour His Royal Highness, the Sultan of Perak. Named after the Anderson's longest serving principal, Mr. C.F.C. Ayre, is Ayre. The red house of Anderson, Whitfield was named after another principal who made significant changes, Mr. L. D. Whitfield. Andersonians are very proud of their alma mater. Thus they named a sport house School and took Anderson's school colour. Parr was named after Colonel C.W.C. Parr, the British Resident of Perak in 1923. The High Commissioner, Sir John Anderson, whom the school was named after, unveiled the memorial which was erected in memory of J.W.W Birch, Perak's first British Resident. In honour of this, a sport house took the name Birch.

School Anthem 
The school anthem was written by Mr. J.R.P.D. de Turville in 1953.

Trivia 

 Filming of the movie, Talentime Yasmin Ahmad's Direction, was held in SMK Anderson's Hall in August 2008.

References

External links 
 SMK Anderson
Interact Club of SMK Anderson
Editorial Board Youtube Channel

1909 establishments in British Malaya
Boys' schools in Malaysia
Buildings and structures in Ipoh
Secondary schools in Malaysia